The Black Ace (Spanish:El as negro) is a 1944 Mexican mystery film directed by René Cardona and starring David T. Bamberg and Manuel Medel.

Cast
   David T. Bamberg as Fu Manchu 
 Tony Díaz
 Janice Logan 
 Chel López
 Manuel Medel 
 Salvador Quiroz 
 Charles Stevens

References

Bibliography 
 Cotter, Bob. The Mexican Masked Wrestler and Monster Filmography. McFarland & Company, 2005.

External links 
 

1944 films
1944 mystery films
Mexican mystery films
1940s Spanish-language films
Films directed by René Cardona

Mexican black-and-white films
1940s Mexican films